The Ctenostomatida are an order of bryozoans in the class Gymnolaemata. The great majority of ctenostome species are marine, although Paludicella inhabits freshwater. They are distinguished from their close relatives, the cheilostomes, by their lack of a calcified exoskeleton. Instead, the exoskeleton is chitinous, gelatinous, or composed only of a soft membrane, and always lacks an operculum. Colonies of ctenostomes are often composed of elongated, branch-like stolons, although more compact forms also exist.

References

 
Protostome orders